Goran Drulić (Serbian Cyrillic: Горан Друлић; born 17 April 1977) is a Serbian retired footballer who played as a striker.

Club career
Born in Negotin, Socialist Federal Republic of Yugoslavia, Drulić joined Red Star Belgrade's youth system at the age of 15, first attracting attention when he scored 51 goals in one season for the club's under-18 side. Before becoming a regular with the first team, he was loaned to FK Voždovac (1995–96), FK Radnički Kragujevac (1996), and FC Barcelona B (1997).

In the summer of 2001, Drulić was sold to Spain's Real Zaragoza for €12.8 million. Injured, he could only make his La Liga debut on 6 February 2002, playing 29 minutes in a 1–1 home draw against CD Tenerife.

In four seasons with the Aragonese club, Drulić only managed to appear in an average of ten league games, scoring just three goals (he played the 2002–03 campaign in Segunda División, netting twice in 12 matches as the club promoted one year after being relegated). He then switched to K.S.C. Lokeren Oost-Vlaanderen in the Belgian Pro League, moving in January 2006 to Greece's OFI Crete FC.

In 2008–09, Drulić stayed in the country but dropped down to the second level, joining Kavala FC. In the following season he returned to Spain, signing for amateurs CD La Muela also in Aragon and helping the club achieve a first-ever promotion to Segunda División B.

International career
Drulić made his debut for FR Yugoslavia on 15 November 2000, in a 1–2 friendly loss in Romania. In total he had four full caps, two in exhibition games and two in the 2002 FIFA World Cup qualification stage.

References

External links

National team data  

WorldSoccer biography 

1977 births
Living people
People from Negotin
Serbian footballers
Association football forwards
First League of Serbia and Montenegro players
Red Star Belgrade footballers
FK Voždovac players
FK Radnički 1923 players
La Liga players
Segunda División players
Segunda División B players
Tercera División players
FC Barcelona Atlètic players
Real Zaragoza players
CD La Muela players
Belgian Pro League players
K.S.C. Lokeren Oost-Vlaanderen players
Super League Greece players
Football League (Greece) players
OFI Crete F.C. players
Kavala F.C. players
Serbia and Montenegro international footballers
Serbian expatriate footballers
Serbia and Montenegro expatriate footballers
Serbia and Montenegro footballers
Expatriate footballers in Spain
Expatriate footballers in Belgium
Expatriate footballers in Greece
Expatriate footballers in Andorra
Serbian expatriate sportspeople in Spain
Serbian expatriate sportspeople in Greece
Serbian expatriate sportspeople in Andorra
Serbia and Montenegro expatriate sportspeople in Spain
Serbia and Montenegro expatriate sportspeople in Belgium